La Ruinette is a mountain of the Swiss Pennine Alps, overlooking the Lake of Mauvoisin in the canton of Valais. With an altitude of 3,875 metres above sea level, it is the highest summit between the Grand Combin and the Dent Blanche. La Ruinette lies close to the better known Mont Blanc de Cheilon which has almost the same height (3,870 m).

See also

List of mountains of the Alps above 3000 m
List of mountains of Switzerland

References

External links
 La Ruinette on Summitpost
 La Ruinette on Hikr

Mountains of the Alps
Alpine three-thousanders
Mountains of Valais
Mountains of Switzerland
Three-thousanders of Switzerland